Wriezen is a town in the district Märkisch-Oderland, in Brandenburg, Germany. It is situated 11 km southeast of Bad Freienwalde.

Demography

Photogallery

Notable people
 Henning von Boehmer (born 1943), journalist and commercial lawyer, former general secretary of the International Chamber of Commerce - Germany (ICC)
 Cornelia Froboess (born 1943), actress, teen idol and pop singer
 Michael Succow (born 1941), biologist and agronomist, an honorary citizen of the municipality Lüdersdorf / Biesdorf, now district Wriezen

See also
Berlin Wriezener Bahnhof

References

External links

Localities in Märkisch-Oderland